Park Township Airport  was a public airport located in Park Township, 3 mi (5 km) northwest of Holland, Michigan, United States. Built in 1937, the airport was operated by Ottawa Aviation, an organization of local users whose aim was to promote the value of the airport to the surrounding community.

The airport had a main paved runway (5/23) that was demolished around August 15, 2020, and an intersecting grass runway (12/30) that still exists today. With the failure of a millage, the airport no longer supports fixed wing aircraft.

The airport was used for general aviation and had no regularly scheduled commercial flights.  It was quite popular with ultralight and model aircraft. The airport was also home to the Experimental Aircraft Association Chapter 1242.

References

External links
 Michigan Airport Directory - KHLM
 Park Township Airport website

Defunct airports in Michigan
Airports in Michigan
Buildings and structures in Ottawa County, Michigan
Transportation in Ottawa County, Michigan
Airports established in 1937
1937 establishments in Michigan